Chesnee is a city in Spartanburg and Cherokee counties, in the U.S. state of South Carolina. The population was 868 as of the 2010 census.

History

In the early 20th century, the Chesnee Land Company bought a sizeable acreage at what is now Chesnee. A leading member of the company was John B. Cleveland of Spartanburg. Cleveland named the company - and later the town - after his great-grandmother, Margaret Chesnee, who was born in Scotland. She married Alexander Vernon, also born in Scotland. The Clinchfield Railroad ran an excursion train over the newly laid rails to Spartanburg on October 23, 1909.

The Chesnee post office was established in 1910, and the town was chartered in 1911. Early businesses included a hotel, pharmacy, cotton mill, and lumber mill.

The Cowpens National Battlefield and Zeno Hicks House are listed on the National Register of Historic Places.

Geography
Chesnee is located near the northeast corner of Spartanburg County, and a small part of the city extends east into Cherokee County. U.S. Route 221 passes through the city as Alabama Avenue and Hampton Street, leading north  to Rutherfordton, North Carolina, and south  to Spartanburg. South Carolina Highway 11 (Cherokee Street) crosses US 221 in the center of town and leads west  to Campobello and east past Cowpens National Battlefield  to Gaffney.

Demographics

2020 census

As of the 2020 United States census, there were 829 people, 324 households, and 159 families residing in the city.

2000 census
As of the census of 2000, there were 1,003 people, 396 households, and 239 families residing in the city. The population density was 1,116.4 people per square mile (430.3/km2). There were 460 housing units at an average density of 512.0 per square mile (197.3/km2). The racial makeup of the city was 68.20% White, 27.52% African American, 0.30% Native American, 0.10% Asian, 1.99% from other races, and 1.89% from two or more races. Hispanic or Latino people of any race were 4.69% of the population.

There were 396 households, out of which 26.3% had children under the age of 18 living with them, 39.6% were married couples living together, 17.7% had a female householder with no husband present, and 39.4% were non-families. Of all households, 35.4% were made up of individuals, and 13.4% had someone living alone who was 65 years of age or older. The average household size was 2.43 and the average family size was 3.18.

In the city, the population was spread out, with 25.3% under the age of 18, 9.9% from 18 to 24, 26.8% from 25 to 44, 22.2% from 45 to 64, and 15.8% who were 65 years of age or older. The median age was 37 years. For every 100 females, there were 87.8 males. For every 100 females age 18 and over, there were 77.9 males.

The median income for a household in the city was $25,089, and the median income for a family was $33,438. Males had a median income of $30,000 versus $17,500 for females. The per capita income for the city was $12,993. About 16.5% of families and 24.3% of the population were below the poverty line, including 37.6% of those under age 18 and 6.6% of those age 65 or over.

Education
Public education is administered by Spartanburg County School District 2.  Three schools are located in Chesnee, including Chesnee High School.

Chesnee has a lending library, a branch of the Spartanburg County Public Library.

Notable people
 Woody Abernathy, repaired broadloom in Chesnee for 30 years after retiring from pitching with the New York Giants
 Sonja Glenn, 1998 Miss South Carolina USA
 Stephen Twitty, decorated U.S. Army major general

References

External links
 City of Chesnee official website
 Governmental information on City of Chesnee
 History and community information about Chesnee

Cities in Cherokee County, South Carolina
Cities in South Carolina
Cities in Spartanburg County, South Carolina